Wei Zhao (204–273), courtesy name Hongsi, was an official, historian and scholar of the state of Eastern Wu during the Three Kingdoms period of China. He shared the same personal name as Sima Zhao (an ancestor of the Jin dynasty emperors) so, in order to avoid naming taboo, the historian Chen Shou changed Wei Zhao's personal name to "Yao()" when he wrote Wei Zhao's biography in the Sanguozhi (the authoritative source for the history of the Three Kingdoms period).

Life
Wei Zhao was appointed as the first Erudite Libationer (博士祭酒; i.e. President) of the precursor to the Imperial Nanking University by the third Wu emperor, Sun Xiu, in 258. He was the chief editor of the Book of Wu, an official history of Wu. While he was compiling the 'Book of Wu, the fourth Wu emperor Sun Hao attempted to force him to rewrite certain portions of the book, but Wei Zhao refused on the grounds that such amendments would infringe the principle of history. Wei Zhao's insistence on producing a historically accurate Book of Wu resulted in his execution by Sun Hao. Wei Zhao also wrote several other works, such as Annotations to Guoyu (國語注) and Argument and Interpretation of Names.

Wei Zhao's tomb is located near East Street, Yanling Town in Danyang, Jiangsu. The Wei Zhao Temple, a memorial to him along with his former residence, is also located near there.

See also
 Lists of people of the Three Kingdoms

References

 Chen, Shou (3rd century). Records of the Three Kingdoms (Sanguozhi).
 Pei, Songzhi (5th century). Annotations to Records of the Three Kingdoms (Sanguozhi zhu).

204 births
273 deaths
Eastern Wu politicians
Eastern Wu historians
Writers from Zhenjiang
Politicians from Zhenjiang
Forced suicides of Chinese people
Suicides in Eastern Wu
Executed Eastern Wu people
Eastern Wu essayists
3rd-century executions
Executed people from Jiangsu
People executed by Eastern Wu
Historians from Jiangsu
3rd-century Chinese historians